Jerald B. Harkness (May 7, 1940 – August 24, 2021) was an American professional basketball player. He played for the New York Knicks of the National Basketball Association (NBA) and the Indiana Pacers of the American Basketball Association (ABA). Harkness played college basketball for the Loyola Ramblers, where he was captain of the 1962–63 team that won the 1963 NCAA national championship. A consensus first-team All-American, Harkness was selected by the Knicks in the second round of the 1963 NBA draft. He was also a civil rights activist.

Early life and career
Harkness was born in Harlem. Before playing in the professional leagues, the  Harkness was a star at DeWitt Clinton High School and Loyola University Chicago.

At Loyola, he was a consensus first-team All-American and served as captain of its 1962–63 team that won the national championship. In the first round of the NCAA tournament, Loyola defeated Tennessee Tech by 111–42, which  remains the largest margin of victory (69 points) in an NCAA tournament game. In the second round, Loyola faced Mississippi State in a historic match now known as the Game of Change. Facing Loyola's lineup with four black starters, Mississippi State defied segregationists by participating, breaking an unwritten law against Mississippi teams competing against teams with black players. Harkness was enshrined in history as he shook hands with Joe Dan Gold, the white captain of Mississippi State, prior to tip-off. In a 2013 interview, Harkness told NPR of the handshake: "The flashbulbs just went off unbelievably, and at that time, boy, I knew that this was more than just a game. This was history being made." Loyola beat Mississippi State, then sailed past Illinois and Duke to reach the tournament final. Loyola then upset the Cincinnati Bearcats in overtime to win the championship game. Harkness and the other four Loyola starters played the entire game, without substitution.

He then advanced to the pros after being drafted by the New York Knicks in the second round (10th pick overall) of the 1963 NBA draft. Harkness played one season (1963–64) with the Knicks.  He spent three seasons with the Twin Cities Sailors of the NABL; in his third (and final) NABL season, he was named All-League (2nd team).  The honor played a part in him securing an ABA contract with the Indiana Pacers. He then played two seasons (1967–1969) with the ABA's Indiana Pacers.

Though his professional career was relatively short, he left his mark in the record books on November 13, 1967, when he hit an  game-winning buzzer beater to lead the Pacers past the Dallas Chaparrals, 119–118. Harkness' shot remains the longest game-winning shot ever made.

Life after basketball
Harkness became the first African-American salesman for Quaker Oats. In 1970, Harkness became the first African-American fundraiser in Indianapolis, working for the United Way of Greater Indianapolis. He was Indianapolis' first African-American sportscaster at WTHR (formerly WLWI) in the mid to late 1970s.
 
He also devoted much of his time to civil rights issues. He worked with the Southern Christian Leadership Conference in the early 1970s, and he served as executive director of the Indianapolis chapter of 100 Black Men, a national organization dedicated to supporting and training young African American males.

Harkness died in Indianapolis on August 24, 2021, at the age of 81.

Awards and honors

On July 11, 2013, in the Oval Office of the White House, Harkness and former Loyola teammates John Egan, Les Hunter and Ron Miller met with President Barack Obama to commemorate the 50th anniversary of the school's 1963 national championship. To date it remains the only NCAA Division I basketball championship won by a university from the state of Illinois. In September 2013, Harkness and the entire 1963 Loyola Ramblers NCAA Championship basketball team was inducted into the Chicagoland Sports Hall of Fame. The 1963 Loyola Ramblers were inducted in the College Basketball Hall of Fame in November 2013.

In June 2013, Harkness was awarded the Muhammad Ali Athlete Award. He is a member of the New York City Basketball Hall of Fame and the Loyola Athletics Hall of Fame.

Notes

References

Further reading
 Ramblers: Loyola Chicago 1963 – The Team That Changed the Color of College Basketball by Michael Lenehan, published by Agate Publishing, February 18, 2013.

External links

Dan Carpenter: Indy's Jerry Harkness lived basketball and history, in black and white

1940 births
2021 deaths
20th-century African-American sportspeople
21st-century African-American people
Activists for African-American civil rights
African-American basketball players
All-American college men's basketball players
American men's basketball players
Basketball players from New York City
DeWitt Clinton High School alumni
Indiana Pacers players
Loyola Ramblers men's basketball players
New York Knicks draft picks
New York Knicks players
People from Harlem
Point guards
Shooting guards
Sportspeople from Manhattan
Syracuse Nationals draft picks